Diana Dayana Ana Catalina Bolocco Fonck (born 30 July 1977) is a Chilean journalist, known as sister of Cecilia Bolocco, Miss Universe 1987.

Biography
Bolocco was born in Santiago, Chile, to businessman Enzo Bolocco Cintolesi, of Italian-Arbëreshë descent, and Rose Marie Fonck Assler, of German descent. She attended primary and secondary school at Santiago College. Her siblings are: Cecilia, John Paul, Veronica, and Rodrigo (1986).

Her first television appearance was at age 9 years. She also appeared in an advertisement for the cosmetics brand Pamela Grant.

On 26 November 1999, she married Gonzalo Cisternas, with whom she had two sons, Pedro and Gonzalo. After studying journalism at the Catholic University of Chile in 2001, she was part of her sister Cecilia's website, but the website was closed a year and a half later for lack of funds. She also worked on the production of the show La Noche de Cecilia, issued by Megavisión.

In 2006, she separated from her husband and decided to devote herself to television. She debuted on the program Locos por el baile (2006) from Channel 13, where she served as a reporter backstage and co-host of Sergio Lagos.

She was named Queen of the XLVIII Viña del Mar International Song Festival in February 2007. On 15 October the same year opened the second season of Mad About Dance, where Diana was the host of Sergio Lagos.

She continues to work on Channel 13 and will be international panel of judges at the Viña del Mar International Song Festival in 2010.
In 2011, she hosted the program ¿Quién quiere ser millonario?: Alta tensión. She also started dating Cristián Sánchez.

From 2012 she and Martin Carcamo host  Vértigo, a TV success that has kept them on the top of the Chilean TV business until now. Next year she married Cristian Sanchez, with whom she has two more children.

References

External links

 

1977 births
Chilean women journalists
Chilean television presenters
Chilean television personalities
Chilean people of Italian descent
Chilean people of Arbëreshë descent
Chilean people of German descent
Living people
People from Santiago
Pontifical Catholic University of Chile alumni
Chilean women television presenters